Rita Levi-Montalcini  (22 April 1909 – 30 December 2012) was an Italian Nobel laureate, honored for her work in neurobiology. She was awarded the 1986 Nobel Prize in Physiology or Medicine jointly with colleague Stanley Cohen for the discovery of nerve growth factor (NGF).

From 2001 until her death, she also served in the Italian Senate as a Senator for Life. This honor was given due to her significant scientific contributions. On 22 April 2009, she became the first Nobel laureate to reach the age of 100, and the event was feted with a party at Rome's City Hall.

Early life and education
Levi-Montalcini was born on 22 April 1909 in Turin,
to Italian Jewish parents with roots dating back to the Roman Empire. She and her twin sister Paola were the youngest of four children. Her parents were Adele Montalcini, a painter, and Adamo Levi, an electrical engineer and mathematician, whose families had moved from Asti and Casale Monferrato, respectively, to Turin at the turn of the twentieth century.

In her teenage years, she considered becoming a writer and admired Swedish writer Selma Lagerlöf, but after seeing a close family friend die of stomach cancer she decided to attend the University of Turin Medical School. Her father discouraged his daughters from attending college, as he feared it would disrupt their potential lives as wives and mothers, but eventually he supported Levi-Montalcini's aspirations to become a doctor. While she was at the University of Turin, the neurohistologist Giuseppe Levi sparked her interest in the developing nervous system. After graduating summa cum laude M.D. in 1936, Montalcini remained at the university as Levi's assistant, but her academic career was cut short by Benito Mussolini's 1938 Manifesto of Race and the subsequent introduction of laws barring Jews from academic and professional careers.

Career and research
Levi-Montalcini lost her assistant position in the anatomy department after a 1938 law barring Jews from university positions was passed. During World War II she set up a laboratory in her bedroom in Turin and studied the growth of nerve fibers in chicken embryos, discovering that nerve cells die when they lack targets, and laying the groundwork for much of her later research. She described this experience decades later in the science documentary film Death by Design/The Life and Times of Life and Times (1997). The film also features her fraternal twin sister Paola, who became a respected artist best known for her aluminum sculptures designed to bring light to the rooms due to the reflective white surface.

When the Germans invaded Italy in September 1943, her family fled south to Florence, where they survived the Holocaust, under false identities, protected by some non-Jewish friends. During the Nazi occupation, Levi-Montalcini was in contact with the partisans of the Action Party. After the liberation of Florence in August 1944, she volunteered her medical expertise for the Allied health service. Her family returned to Turin in 1945.

In September 1946, Levi-Montalcini was granted a one-semester research fellowship in the laboratory of Professor Viktor Hamburger at Washington University in St. Louis; he was interested in two of the articles Levi-Montalcini had published in foreign scientific journals. After she duplicated the results of her home laboratory experiments, Hamburger offered her a research associate position, which she held for 30 years. It was there that, in 1952, she did her most important work: isolating nerve growth factor (NGF) from observations of certain cancerous tissues that cause extremely rapid growth of nerve cells. By transferring pieces of tumors to chick embryos, Montalcini established a mass of cells that was full of nerve fibers. The discovery of nerves growing everywhere like a halo around the tumor cells was surprising. When describing it, Montalcini said it is: "like rivulets of water flowing steadily over a bed of stones." The nerve growth produced by the tumor was unlike anything she had seen before – the nerves took over areas that would become other tissues and even entered veins in the embryo. But nerves did not grow into the arteries, which would flow from the embryo back to the tumor. This suggested to Montalcini that the tumor itself was releasing a substance that was stimulating the growth of nerves.

She was made a full professor in 1958. In 1962, she established a second laboratory in Rome and divided her time between there and St. Louis. In 1963, she became the first woman to receive the Max Weinstein Award (given by the United Cerebral Palsy Association) due to her significant contributions into neurological research.

From 1961 to 1969, she directed the Research Center of Neurobiology of the CNR (Rome), and from 1969 to 1978, the Laboratory of Cellular Biology. After she retired in 1977, she was appointed as director of the Institute of Cell Biology of the Italian National Council of Research in Rome. She later retired from that position in 1979, however continued to be involved as a guest professor.

Levi-Montalcini founded the European Brain Research Institute in 2002, and then served as its president. Her role in this institute was at the center of some criticism from some parts of the scientific community in 2010.

Controversies were raised about the cooperation of Levi-Montalcini with the Italian pharmaceutical concern Fidia. While working for Fidia, she improved the understanding of gangliosides. Beginning in 1975, she supported the drug Cronassial (a particular mixture of gangliosides) produced by Fidia from bovine brain tissue. Independent studies showed that the drug actually could be successful in treatment of intended diseases (peripheral neuropathies). Years later, some patients under treatment with Cronassial reported a severe neurological syndrome (Guillain–Barré syndrome). As per the normal cautionary routine, Germany banned Cronassial in 1983, followed by other countries. Italy prohibited the drug only in 1993; at the same time, an investigation revealed that Fidia paid the Italian Ministry of Health for a quick approval of Cronassial and later paid for pushing use of the drug in treatment of diseases where it had not been tested. Levi-Montalcini's relationship with the company was revealed during the investigation, and she was criticized publicly.

In the 1990s, she was one of the first scientists pointing out the importance of the mast cell in human pathology. In the same period (1993), she identified the endogenous compound palmitoylethanolamide as an important modulator of this cell. Understanding this mechanism initiated a new era of research into this compound which has resulted in more discoveries regarding its mechanisms and benefits, a far better understanding of the endocannabinoid system and new liposomal palmitoylethanolamide product formulations designed specifically for improved absorption and bioavailability.

Levi-Montalcini earned a Nobel Prize along with Stanley Cohen in 1986 in the physiology or medicine category. The two earned their Nobel Prizes for their research in to the nerve growth factor (NGF), the protein that causes cell growth due to stimulated nerve tissue.

Political career
On 1 August 2001, she was appointed as Senator for Life by the President of Italy, Carlo Azeglio Ciampi.

On 28–29 April 2006, Levi-Montalcini, aged 97, attended the opening assembly of the newly elected Senate, at which the President of the Senate was elected. She declared her preference for the centre-left candidate Franco Marini. Due to her support of the government of Romano Prodi, she was often criticized by some right-wing senators, who accused her of saving the government when the government's exiguous majority in the Senate was at risk. Her old age was mocked by far-right politician Francesco Storace.

Personal life
Levi-Montalcini's father, Adamo Levi, was an electrical engineer and mathematician, and her mother, Adele Montalcini, was a painter. The family's Jewish roots extend back to the Roman Empire; due to the family's strict and traditional background, Adamo was not supportive of women attending college as it would intrude in their ability to tend to the children and house.

Levi-Montalcini had an older brother Gino, who died after a heart attack in 1974. He was one of the best-known contemporary Italian architects and a professor at the University of Turin. She had two sisters: Anna, five years older than Rita, and Paola, her twin sister, a popular artist who died on 29 September 2000, age 91.

In 2003, she filed a libel suit for defamation against Beppe Grillo. During a show, Grillo called the 94-year-old woman an "old whore".

Levi-Montalcini never married and had no children. In a 2006 interview she said, "I never had any hesitation or regrets in this sense... My life has been enriched by excellent human relations, work and interests. I have never felt lonely." She died in her home in Rome on 30 December 2012 at the age of 103.

Upon her death, the Mayor of Rome, Gianni Alemanno, stated it was a great loss "for all of humanity." He praised her as someone who represented "civic conscience, culture and the spirit of research of our time." Italian astrophysicist Margherita Hack told Sky TG24 TV in a tribute to her fellow scientist, "She is really someone to be admired." Italy's premier, Mario Monti, paid tribute to Levi-Montalcini's "charismatic and tenacious" character and for her lifelong endeavor to "defend the battles in which she believed." Vatican spokesman Federico Lombardi praised Levi-Montalcini's civil and moral efforts, saying she was an "inspiring" example for Italy and the world.

According to the former President of the Grand Orient of Italy, she was invited and participated in many cultural events organized by the main Italian Masonic organization.

Awards and honors

In 1966, she was elected a Fellow of the American Academy of Arts and Sciences.

In 1968, she became the tenth woman elected to the United States National Academy of Sciences. She was elected an EMBO Member in 1974.

In 1970, she received the Golden Plate Award of the American Academy of Achievement.

In 1974, she became a member of the Pontifical Academy of Sciences

In 1983, she was awarded the Louisa Gross Horwitz Prize from Columbia University.

In 1985, she was awarded the Ralph W. Gerard Prize in Neuroscience.

In 1986, she was elected to the American Philosophical Society.

In 1986, Levi-Montalcini and collaborator Stanley Cohen received the Nobel Prize in Medicine, as well as the Albert Lasker Award for Basic Medical Research. This made her the fourth Nobel Prize winner to come from Italy's small (less than 50,000 people) but very old Jewish community, after Emilio Segrè, Salvador Luria (a university colleague and friend) and Franco Modigliani.

In 1987, she received the National Medal of Science, the highest American scientific honor.

In 1991, she received the Laurea Honoris Causa in Medicine from the University of Trieste, Italy. On that occasion, she expressed her desire to formulate a Carta of Human Duties as necessary counterpart of the too much neglected Declaration of Human Rights. The vision of Rita Levi-Montalcini came true with the issuing of the Trieste Declaration of Human Duties and the foundation in 1993 of the International Council of Human Duties, International Council of Human Duties (ICHD), at the University of Trieste.

She was elected a Foreign Member of the Royal Society (ForMemRS) in 1995.

In 1999, Levi-Montalcini was nominated Goodwill Ambassador of the United Nations Food and Agriculture Organization (FAO) by FAO Director-General Jacques Diouf.

In 2001, she was nominated Senator-for-life by the Italian President Carlo Azeglio Ciampi.

In 2006, Levi-Montalcini received the degree Honoris Causa in Biomedical Engineering from the Polytechnic University of Turin, in her native city.

In 2008, she received the PhD Honoris Causa from the Complutense University of Madrid, Spain.

In 2009, she received the Leonardo da Vinci Award from European Academy of Sciences.

In 2011, at the Sapienza University of Rome she received the PhD Honoris Causa from the McGill University, Canada.

She was a founding member of Città della Scienza. and Academician of Studium, Accademia di Casale e del Monferrato, Italy.

Other attributions
 In April 2016, a spontaneous orchid (a hybrid between Ophrys incubacea and Ophrys sphegodes subsp. classica), was named after her: 'Ophrys × montalciniae'.

 The videogame Elite Dangerous has named numerous space stations after her.

See also
 Timeline of women in science

Bibliography

 Levi-Montalcini, Rita, In Praise of Imperfection: My Life and Work.(Elogio dell'imperfezione) Basic Books, New York, 1988.
 Yount, Lisa (1996). Twentieth Century Women Scientists. New York: Facts on File. .
 Muhm, Myriam : Vage Hoffnung für Parkinson-Kranke – Überlegungen der Medizin-Nobelpreisträgerin Rita Levi-Montalcini, Süddeutsche Zeitung #293, p. 22. December 1986

Publications

 Origine ed Evoluzione del nucleo accessorio del Nervo abducente nell'embrione di pollo, Roma, Tip. Cuggiani, 1942.
 Il messaggio nervoso, con Pietro Angeletti e Giuseppe Moruzzi, Milano, Rizzoli, 1975.
 New developments in neurobiological research, in "Commentarii", vol. III, n. 15, Pontificia Academia Scientiarum, 1976.
 Elogio dell'imperfezione, Milano, Garzanti, 1987.  (1999, nuova edizione accresciuta).
 NGF. Apertura di una nuova frontiera nella neurobiologia, Roma-Napoli, Theoria, 1989. .
Sclerosi multipla in Italia. Aspetti e problemi, con Mario Alberto Battaglia, Genova, AISM, 1989. .
Presentazione di Max Perutz, È necessaria la scienza?, Milano, Garzanti, 1989. .
Prefazione a Carlo Levi, Poesie inedite. 1934–1946, Roma, Mancosu, 1990.
Prefazione a Gianni Bonadonna, Donne in medicina, Milano, Rizzoli, 1991. .
Presentazione di Gilberto Salmoni, Memoria: un telaio infinito Dialogo su un mondo tutto da scoprire, Genova, Costa & Nolan, 1993.
Prefazione a Giacomo Scotti (a cura di), Non si trova cioccolata. Lettere di bambini jugoslavi nell'orrore della guerra, Napoli, Pironti, 1993. .
Reti. Scienza, cultura, economia, con Guido Cimino e Lauro Galzigna, Ancona, Transeuropa, 1993. .
Vito Volterra. Il suo percorso, in Scienza, tecnologia e istituzioni in Europa. Vito Volterra e l'origine del CNR, Roma-Bari, Laterza, 1993. .
 Il tuo futuro, Milano, Garzanti, 1993. .
 Per i settanta anni della Enciclopedia italiana, 1925–1995, in 1925–1995: la Treccani compie 70 anni. Mostra storico-documentaria, Roma, Treccani, Istituto della Enciclopedia italiana, 1995.
Prefazione an American Medical Association, L'uso degli animali nella ricerca scientifica. Libro bianco, Bologna, Esculapio, 1995.
 Senz'olio contro vento, Milano, Baldini & Castoldi, 1996. .
 L'asso nella manica a brandelli, Milano, Baldini & Castoldi, 1998. .
 La galassia mente, Milano, Baldini & Castoldi, 1999. .
Presentazione di Nicola Canal, Angelo Ghezzi e Mauro Zaffaroni, Sclerosi multipla. Attualità e prospettive, Milano, Masson, 1999. .
Intervista in Serena Zoli, Storie di ordinaria resurrezione (e non). Fuori dalla depressione e altri mali oscuri, Milano, Rizzoli, 1999. .
L'Università delle tre culture. Conferenza della professoressa Rita Levi-Montalcini, Sondrio, Banca Popolare di Sondrio, 1999.
 Cantico di una vita, Milano, Cortina, 2000. .
 Un universo inquieto. Vita e opere di Paola Levi Montalcini, Milano, Baldini & Castoldi, 2001. .
 Tempo di mutamenti, Milano, Baldini & Castoldi, 2002. .
 Tempo di azione, Milano, Baldini Castoldi Dalai, 2004. .
 Abbi il coraggio di conoscere, Milano, Rizzoli, 2004. .
Lungo le vie della conoscenza. Un viaggio per sentieri inesplorati con Rita Levi-Montalcini, con Giuseppina Tripodi, Brescia, Serra Tarantola, 2005. .
 Eva era africana, Roma, Gallucci, 2005. .
I nuovi magellani nell'er@ digitale, con Giuseppina Tripodi, Milano, Rizzoli, 2006. .
Tempo di revisione, con Giuseppina Tripodi, Milano, Baldini Castoldi Dalai, 2006. .
 La vita intellettuale, in La vita intellettuale. Professioni, arti, impresa in Italia e nel pianeta. Atti del forum internazionale, 13 e 14 febbraio 2007, Bologna, Salone del podesta di Palazzo Re Enzo, Piazza del Nettuno, Bologna, Proctor, 2007. .
Rita Levi-Montalcini racconta la scuola ai ragazzi|Rita Levi-Montalcini con Giuseppina Tripodi racconta la scuola ai ragazzi, Milano, Fabbri, 2007. .
Le tue antenate. Donne pioniere nella società e nella scienza dall'antichità ai giorni nostri, con Giuseppina Tripodi, Roma, Gallucci, 2008. .
La clessidra della vita di Rita Levi-Montalcini, con Giuseppina Tripodi, Milano, Baldini Castoldi Dalai, 2008. .
 Ritmi d'arte, Serra Tarantola, 2008. .
 Cronologia di una scoperta, Milano, Baldini Castoldi Dalai, 2009. .
 L'altra parte del mondo, con Giuseppina Tripodi, Milano, Rizzoli, 2009. .

References

Further reading

External links

 
 Interview with Rita Levi-Montalcini (dated 26 November 2008)
 Biography of Rita Levi-Montalcini at Embryo Project Encyclopedia
 Article in German
 The Official Site of Louisa Gross Horwitz Prize
 AFP Biography (dated 22 April 2009) celebrating Rita Levi-Montalcini's 100th Birthday
 Is this the secret of eternal life? (Independent article on R L-M)
 Italians rally to condemn Nobel 'bribe' allegation: Professor rejects claim by civil servant that a pharmaceuticals firm 'bought' her 1986 prize for medicine
An Annual Reviews Conversations Interview with Rita Levi-Montalcini (video)
1979 article in Scientific American describing the discovery of nerve growth factor

1909 births
2012 deaths
20th-century Italian scientists
20th-century American women scientists
21st-century Sephardi Jews
FAO Goodwill ambassadors
Fellows of the American Academy of Arts and Sciences
Foreign Members of the Royal Society
Italian exiles
Italian centenarians
20th-century Italian Jews
Italian life senators
Italian Nobel laureates
Italian neuroscientists
Italian women neuroscientists
Italian women biologists
Jewish scientists
Jewish women scientists
Members of the European Molecular Biology Organization
Members of the French Academy of Sciences
Members of the Pontifical Academy of Sciences
Members of the United States National Academy of Sciences
National Medal of Science laureates
Nobel laureates affiliated with Missouri
Nobel laureates in Physiology or Medicine
Scientists from Turin
Recipients of the Albert Lasker Award for Basic Medical Research
Recipients of the Great Cross of the National Order of Scientific Merit (Brazil)
Italian twins 
University of Turin alumni
Washington University in St. Louis faculty
Women Nobel laureates
Women centenarians
National Research Council (Italy) people
Italian Sephardi Jews
Jewish American atheists
Washington University School of Medicine faculty